Brett Brian (born September 22, 1962) is an American former weightlifter. He competed at the 1988 Summer Olympics and the 1992 Summer Olympics.

References

External links
 

1962 births
Living people
American male weightlifters
Olympic weightlifters of the United States
Weightlifters at the 1988 Summer Olympics
Weightlifters at the 1992 Summer Olympics
Sportspeople from Baton Rouge, Louisiana
Pan American Games medalists in weightlifting
Pan American Games silver medalists for the United States
Pan American Games bronze medalists for the United States
Weightlifters at the 1987 Pan American Games
Weightlifters at the 1991 Pan American Games
20th-century American people
21st-century American people